Below is a list of museums in İzmir, Turkey, indicated with the neighborhood and the district where each is located

Art museums
 İzmir Art and Sculpture Museum
 Selçuk Yaşar Museum of Arts, Alsancak, Konak

Cultural and historical museums
 Izmir Archeology Museum, Bahribaba Park, Konak
 Izmir Ethnography Museum, Bahribaba Park, Konak
 Izmir Museum of History and Art, Kültürpark, Konak
 Ahmet Priştina Museum of Metropolitan History, Çankaya, Konak
 Izmir Museum of Commercial History, Izmir Chamber of Commerce Building, Alsancak, Konak
 Agora Open Air Museum of İzmir, Agora of Smyrna, Konak
 Bostanlı Open-air Archaeological Museum

Memorial museums and commemorative collections
 Atatürk Museum (İzmir), Alsancak, Konak

Military museums
 İnciralti Sea Museum, İnciraltı, Balçova

Technical and natural-history museums
 İzmir Railroad Museum, Alsancak, Konak

Other
İzmir Toy Museum
 İzmir Women's Museum

See also
 List of museums in Turkey

Sources

 

Izmir
Museums
 *